Rudolf Krčil (5 March 1906 – 3 April 1981) was a Czech football player and later manager. He played as a midfielder for several clubs, including Teplitzer FK and Slavia Prague. He made 20 appearances for the Czechoslovakia national team and was a participant at the 1934 FIFA World Cup, where he played all four matches. Krčil later worked as a football manager, coaching among others FK Teplice and Rudá hvězda Brno.

References 
 
 Profile at ČMFS website

1906 births
1981 deaths
People from Teplice
Czech footballers
Czechoslovak footballers
Association football midfielders
Czechoslovakia international footballers
1934 FIFA World Cup players
Teplitzer FK players
SK Slavia Prague players
Floriana F.C. players
FC St. Pauli players
Czechoslovak football managers
Czech football managers
FK Teplice managers
FC Viktoria Plzeň managers
Czechoslovak expatriate footballers
Czechoslovak expatriate sportspeople in Malta
Expatriate footballers in Malta
Sportspeople from the Ústí nad Labem Region